Tamiya Rough Rider was the very first of Tamiya's SRB (Special racing buggies) series. These according to Tamiya made Radio Control Models accessible to everyone. The design is famous for its fibre glass chassis with rear torsion bars and front hairpin springs.
These models originally cost 18,000 yen. They are very popular these days to collectors being first in the series that produced legends like the Sand Scorcher and the Super Champ.
These days, MIB (Mint in Box) examples of this model are very rare and change hands for a lot of money. Even what can only be described as wrecks change hands for good money.

Specifications
Original Tamiya catalog number:58015
Released:1-NOV-79
Drive:Rear 2wd
Suspension:Swingarms rear w/torsion bars, trailing arms front with hairpin springs, oil filled metal dampers
Chassis desc.:fibre glass plate, waterresistant radio box
Body:Hard white plastic
Motor:MabuchiRS-540S
Original price:18000 Yen
Width:210 mm
Length:400 mm
Height:150 mm
Wheelbase:250 mm
Weight:2,100 grams
Scale:1/10
Front tire:Semi pneumatic rubber tire
Rear tire:Semi pneumatic rubber tire

External links and Reference
Tamiyaclub.com

Rough Rider
1:10 radio-controlled off-road buggies